César Ignacio Arocha Masid (born 1959) is a Cuban politician who served as Minister of Transportation from 3 May 2010 until 9 September 2015. He graduated military school and worked in the Soviet Union as a railway engineer. Later was also the commander of  military transport units and military logistics and director general of bulk food in Cuba.

References

External links
 embacubalebanon.com
 buscador.emol.com

Living people
1959 births
Transport ministers of Cuba
Communist Party of Cuba politicians
Place of birth missing (living people)
Date of birth missing (living people)